The Associação Fonográfica Portuguesa (AFP; English: Portuguese Phonographic Association) is the recording industry association of the major labels in Portugal. Created in 1989, it succeeded GPPFV (Portuguese group of producers of Phonograms and videograms) and UNEVA (Union of audio and video editors).

The AFP is the Portuguese group of the International Federation of the Phonographic Industry (IFPI). The AFP gathers the main record publishers that operate in the Portuguese market and its affiliates represent more than 95% of the market.

In January 1994, AFP suspended the Portuguese singles chart but continued to publish the Portuguese albums chart. The singles chart was not resumed until July 2000.

Record charts
The AFP has two official charts:
 Top 50 Albums
 Top 200 Singles

Top Albums 
The weekly album chart includes the best-selling albums based on physical sales. Starting in 2021, it started including digital sales, with streaming still not accounting for the chart.

Top Singles 
A Portuguese singles chart existed from July 2000 until March 2, 2004. Previously a singles chart was published pre-1994 by the AFP. The chart was based on retail data compiled by the local arm of ACNielsen. Starting in 2016, AFP started publishing the top 100 best-selling singles every week based on sales and streaming. In 2020, the list was upgraded to include the 200 best-selling singles.

Sales certifications

Albums

Singles

Music DVDs

Top+ 
The television program Top+, broadcast by RTP1 on every Saturday afternoon, was a weekly charts program done in partnership with the AFP. It aired between 1990 and 2012. At the time of cancellation, it was the longest-running television program in Portugal with the exception of RTP1's evening news programme Telejornal.

References

External links
AFP Official Charts

Music industry associations
Organizations established in 1989
Music organisations based in Portugal